The play-offs of the 2013 Fed Cup Europe/Africa Zone Group I were the final stages of the Group I Zonal Competition involving teams from Europe and Africa. Using the positions determined in their pools, the fifteen teams faced off to determine their placing in the 2013 Fed Cup Europe/Africa Zone Group I. The top two teams advanced to World Group II Play-offs, and the bottom two teams were relegated down to the Europe/Africa Zone Group II.

Pool results

Promotional play-offs 
The first placed teams of each pool were drawn in head-to-head rounds. The winner of each round advanced to the World Group II Play-offs.

Croatia vs. Poland

Great Britain vs. Bulgaria

5th to 8th play-offs
The second placed teams of each pool were drawn in head-to-head rounds to find the equal fifth and seventh placed teams.

Belarus vs. Israel

Hungary vs. Netherlands

9th to 12th play-offs
The third placed teams of each pool were drawn in head-to-head rounds to find the equal ninth and the eleventh placed teams.

Austria vs. Romania

Portugal vs. Slovenia
The play-off tie between Portugal and Slovenia did not take place.

Relegation play-offs 
The last placed teams of each pool were drawn in head-to-head rounds. The loser of each round was relegated down to Europe/Africa Zone Group II in 2014.

Georgia vs. Turkey

Bosnia and Herzegovina vs. Luxembourg

Final placements 

  and  advanced to World Group II play-offs.

See also 
 Fed Cup structure

References

External links 
 Fed Cup website

2013 Fed Cup Europe/Africa Zone